Two vessels of the Royal Navy have been named HMS Primula:

 , a  launched on 22 June 1940 and sold on 22 July 1946.

Citations and references

Royal Navy ship names